The E-site is the third and final binding site for t-RNA in the ribosome during translation, a part of protein synthesis.  The "E" stands for exit, and is accompanied by the P-site (for peptidyl) which is the second binding site, and the A-site (aminoacyl), which is the first binding site. It is involved in cellular processes.

References 

 
 
 Molecular Biology of the Gene, 7th Edition, James D. Watson, Tania A. Baker,Stephen P. Bell,Alexander Gann, Michael Levine,Richard Losick, ©2014 Pearson

Ribosomal RNA